Gabriel Maillé (born 20 December 1995) is a Canadian film and television actor who started as a child actor.

Maillé  appeared in feature films It's Not Me, I Swear! (C'est pas moi, je le jure!) and  1981 before appearing in a lead role in Wetlands (Marécages).

Maillé started early with roles in theater and films including in 2004 Dans une galaxie près de chez vous by Claude Desrosiers and small roles in La Promesse in 2003 and Temps durs and Pure Laine in 2004.

In 2009, he portrayed Jérôme, as Léon's big brother, in It's Not Me, I Swear! (C'est pas moi, je le jure!) by Philippe Falardeau. The same year, he appeared in the latest feature by 
Ricardo Trogi, 1981. His lead role in Wetlands (Marécages) is his biggest role on the screen as yet.

He was also in the television series Yamaska broadcast on  the Quebec television station TVA as Frédérick Harrison for three consecutive seasons. He has also appeared on Le Club des doigts croisés in 2009-2010, a youth series produced by "La Presse Télé" and shown on Radio-Canada.

Filmography
2008: It's Not Me, I Swear! (C'est pas moi, je le jure!) as Jérôme Doré
2009: 1981 as Jérôme
2009-2011: Yamaska as Frédérick Harrison (in 19 episodes)
2011: Wetlands (Marécages) as Simon

References

External links

Living people
1995 births
Canadian male child actors
Canadian male film actors
Canadian male television actors
Male actors from Quebec